Singana is a village development committee in Baglung District in the Dhaulagiri Zone of central Nepal. At the time of the 1991 Nepal census it had a population of 3,365 and had 624 houses in the village.

References

  In the sigana v.D.c  are seven schools . These are 1) Sigana Higher secondary school,2) Sigana Secondary School,3) Baudechaur Secondary School,4) Bhaindanda Lower Secondary School,5) Bharaha Primary School,6) Gankunja Primary School and 7)Bhagawati Primary School.

Populated places in Baglung District